Anthony Mason Jr. is an American former professional basketball player in the United States and France. He is from Memphis, Tennessee.

Personal life
Mason's father, Anthony Mason was a basketball player for the New York Knicks.   Mason currently operates a charity called Family One, Two, Three.  His brother Antoine, was a standout basketball player at Niagara University.

Basketball
Mason, played on the St. John's University Red Storm basketball team. He completed his eligibility for the 2009–10 St. John's Red Storm, and he went on to try out with the Miami Heat, before playing for teams such as the Sioux Falls Skyforce and Cholet Basket.  In the NBDL, he averaged 16.7 points per game.

References

Year of birth missing (living people)
Living people
Basketball players from Memphis, Tennessee
St. John's Red Storm men's basketball players
Sioux Falls Skyforce players
Cholet Basket players
American expatriate basketball people in France